The 2022 COSAFA U-20 Cup was the 28th edition of the COSAFA U-20 Challenge Cup, an international youth football tournament open to national associations of the COSAFA region. It took place between 7 and 16 October 2022 in Eswatini.

Mozambique was the defending champion having defeated Namibia by 1–0 goal in the final on 13 December 2020 of previous season.

Participating teams
The following twelve teams are contesting in the tournament.

Venues

Match officials

Referees

 António Dungula
 Osiase Koto
 Akhona Makalima
 Attoumani El Fachad
 Keren Yocette 
 Keabetswe Dintwa
Assistant Referees
 Estanislau Guedes
 Mohamed Ibrahim
 Khamusi Razwimisani
 Danison Ravelomandimby

Draw
The draw was made in ....... on the.......... Last year's top nations were seeded into one group each and the rest of the teams were placed in 2 pots depending on last year's performance. From the first pot, teams were drawn and slotted consecutively into groups A, B, and C. The last team from pot 1 was then placed among the pot 2 teams to make them 5. Now the teams from the second pot were drawn and slotted consecutively into groups A, B, and C resulting that group C ended up with one less team.

Note: Within brackets 2020 year's performance.

Group stage
The group stage will be played in 3 groups as a round-robin, where the group winners and the best runner up will advance to the semi-finals.

Group A

Group B

Group C

Ranking of second-placed teams

Knockout stage

Semi-finals
Winners qualified for 2023 Africa U-20 Cup of Nations.

Third place match

Final

Goalscorers

References

2022 in African football
COSAFA U-20 Challenge Cup
2022 in Swazi sport
International association football competitions hosted by Eswatini
October 2022 events in Eswatini
COSAFA